Henry Hodges (born June 1, 1993) is an American actor, voice actor and singer. Beginning his acting career at the age of four, Hodges is best known for his musical theatre roles on Broadway; starring as "Chip" in Beauty and the Beast, as "Jeremy Potts" in Chitty Chitty Bang Bang and as "Michael Banks" in Mary Poppins.

Early life
Hodges was born on June 1, 1993 in Bethesda, Maryland.  He has one sibling, an older sister named Charly (born in 1987).  Hodges began his acting career at the age of four and, at the age of eight, he appeared as Tiny Tim in the Ford's Theatre production of A Christmas Carol in Washington, DC.  He subsequently performed in numerous operas over two seasons at The Kennedy Center. After appearing in his second season at Ford's Theater, he was invited to audition for Disney and was selected to play the part of Chip in the tour of Beauty and the Beast.

Career

Broadway
Hodges portrayed the role of the loveable teacup "Chip", the son of "Mrs. Potts", for seven months in the National Tour of Beauty and the Beast in 2003. He was invited to play the same part on Broadway in New York City, where he shared the stage with Christy Carlson Romano, who portrayed "Belle". In 2005, he originated the role of "Jeremy Potts" in the Broadway production of Chitty Chitty Bang Bang, playing the role from First Preview to the Closing Night performance, never missing a show.

Hodges' performance garnered the attention of theatrical producers Cameron Mackintosh and Thomas Schumacher and in 2006 he was cast as an original "Michael Banks" in the successful Broadway production of Mary Poppins, playing the part for over a year and a half. One of the many highlights of being part of the show was when Hodges performed with the cast on the 2007 Tony Awards National Broadcast, where Mary Poppins was nominated for 8 Tony Awards.

Next for Hodges was portraying the roles of MacDuff son and Fleance in the 2008 Broadway production of Shakespeare's Macbeth, starring Patrick Stewart. He then was part of the Original Broadway Musical 13, by acclaimed Broadway composer Jason Robert Brown, understudying the roles of Archie, Evan, Richie, and Simon.

Each year, casts from Broadway shows perform holiday songs for the annual CD fundraiser Carols for a Cure and Hodges can be heard as a soloist on Volumes 6, 7 and 8. He was also an active member of Broadway Kids Care, which brings together young actors from current and past Broadway shows to do community service work.

Regional Theater
Hodges began his acting career as a young boy in productions of Salome, Idomeneo, and M. Butterfly at the Washington Opera and Macbeth with the Kirov Opera, under the direction of opera singer Plácido Domingo. He also performed as Tiny Tim for two seasons in Ford's Theatre production of A Christmas Carol.

As a teenager, Hodges performed at the Tony winning Hartford Stage in two productions. The first was in the role of Jem in To Kill a Mockingbird, with Matthew Modine, which broke all box-office records for Hartford Stage. The second was portraying Horace Robedaux at age 14 in the acclaimed Horton Foote play, The Orphans' Home Cycle. Hodges reprised his role when the show transferred for a successful run at the Signature Theatre in New York City where it garnered a Drama Desk Award for the "Theatrical Event of the Season'.

Next for Hodges was being a part of another Disney production. This time Hodges was Flounder in the re-envisioned production of Disney's The Little Mermaid at Sacramento Music Circus. Among the changes to the show was that Flounder was now a teenager. In addition to showcasing his acting, singing and dancing in the part, he also was able to showcase his love of wave boarding, as he added that skill to his "Under the Sea" role.

In 2014, Hodges performed the lead role of Billy McPherson in the original musical The Kid Who Would Be Pope at Ars Nova in New York City. The musical was the recipient of the 2013 Richard Rodgers Award and American Harmony Prize.

In 2015, Hodges reprised his role as Flounder in The Little Mermaid, this time at the Alabama Shakespeare Theatre. The following summer in 2016, Hodges returned to the Alabama Shakespeare Theatre to perform in the musical that led him to his Broadway Journey - this time playing the role of LeFou in Beauty and the Beast.

Film and Television
Hodges has done voice-over work in a variety of commercials throughout his career. Fans of the Disney "Buddies" movies will recognize Hodges as the voice of the mischievous golden retriever Mudbud in Snow Buddies, with Whoopi Goldberg, and Space Buddies, with Nolan Gould. He has also appeared in the role of Superhero in the film See You in September, again with Whoopi Goldberg. Hodges took fans behind the scenes of Broadway's Mary Poppins in the Disney Channel's Disney 365 and has co-starred on the television show Elementary.

Books
In 2007, Disney Theatrical President Thomas Schumacher featured Hodges in his interactive book published by Disney, How Does the Show Go On. He wrote an essay on a day in his life as a working actor on Broadway. Hodges also helped launch the book with its author at a signing at Barnes and Noble in New York City.

Hodges enjoyed being a part of the book so much that he wanted to write a book of his own, chronicling his acting experiences and sharing advice with other kids who are interested in getting into Show Business. In 2013, Hodges' book, How to Act Like a Kid was published by Disney.

Hodges' book launched with a discussion/signing at the Drama Book Shop in New York City. He also made appearances at several literary events, including: The Library of Congress National Book Festival in Washington DC (where he was the youngest of 100 authors invited to speak and participate), The Junior Theater Festival in Atlanta (as a Celebrity Guest) and at the Chicago Literary Festival.

Personal life
Since beginning his career at the age of 4, Hodges has enjoyed portraying a variety of roles on Broadway, Off-Broadway, Regional Theater, Readings, Recordings, TV and Film.   Hodges enjoys many activities and can be seen riding his unicycle 40 and 50 miles a day around Manhattan. He also taught himself how to play the ukulele and has enjoyed performing and singing on the ukulele at coffee houses and SiriusXM Radio. His other skills include: Acrobatics, Ballet - Pointe, Tap, Flying By Foy, Freerunning, Wave Boarding, Skate Boarding, Juggling, Fencing and Various Accents.

Résumé

Film
2008 Snow Buddies.....Mudbud
2008 Space Buddies.....Mudbud
2010 See You in September.....Superhero

Broadway
2004–2005 Beauty and the Beast (Replacement).....Chip
2005 Chitty Chitty Bang Bang  (Original Cast).....Jeremy Potts
2006–2008 Mary Poppins  (Original Cast).....Michael Banks
2008 Macbeth  (Original Cast).....MacDuff's son and Fleance
2008–2009 13  (Original Cast).....Understudy: Archie, Evan, Richie, Simon

Off-Broadway
 2009–2010 The Orphans' Home Cycle - Signature Theater (Original Cast).....Horace Robedaux

Regional Theater
 2001 A Christmas Carol - Ford's Theater, Washington DC.....Tiny Tim
 2009 To Kill a Mockingbird - Hartford Stage.....Jem
 2009 The Orphans' Home Cycle - Hartford Stage (Original Cast).....Horace Robedaux
 2012 The Little Mermaid - Sacramento Music Circus (Original Cast) ....Flounder

Awards

References

 The Best Connecticut Stage Performances in 2009 - Behind the Curtain | Frank Rizzo

External links
 
 
 Broadway Kids Care

1993 births
Male actors from Washington, D.C.
Male actors from Maryland
American male child actors
American child singers
American male film actors
American male musical theatre actors
Living people
People from Bethesda, Maryland